Restless Heart is an American country music band.

Restless Heart may also refer to:

Film
Restless Heart: The Confessions of Saint Augustine or Augustine: The Decline of the Roman Empire, a 2010 Italian-German television film
Restless Hearts, a 1928 German-Spanish silent film

Music
Restless Heart (Paul Field album) or the title song, 1982
Restless Heart (Restless Heart album) or the title song, 1985
Restless Heart (Whitesnake album) or the title song, 1997
"Restless Heart" (John Parr song), 1988
"Restless Heart" (Peter Cetera song), 1992
"Restless Heart", a song by Jerry Lee Lewis from Young Blood, 1995